Long Pasia is a village in Sipitang District, Sabah. Long Pasia is a home town of Lun Bawang/Lun Dayeh tribes and has a population of about 1,000 people, and all of them are Christians of  Borneo Evangelical Church (SIB).

Key economic activities are paddy planting and ecotourism. It is renowned for its diversity of orchid species, as well as pitcher plants which can be found in abundance in Long Pa' Sia' Kerangas Park and in forests around Ulu Padas river. It is also home to the Black Oriole, an endemic bird of Borneo.

There are Several natural forest areas have been earmarked as potential areas to be developed as ecotourism attraction such as:-

Maga-Pasia Waterfall (Ruab Maga)
Sinipung Mountain (Pegkung Sinipung)
Sinipung Lake (Takung Sinipung)
Rekong Waterfall (Ruab Rekong)
Estuary of Rekiran River (Pa' Rekiran)
Pulau Waterfall (Pa' Pulau)
Pinasat River (Long Pinasat)
Matang River – Kuala Bayur, Yang Abpe, Batu Narit, Kuala Palanuk, *Popokon, Yang Anang (Bukit Agathis)
Fefuken Waterfall
Taman Kerangas Long Pasia
Other areas adjacent to Long Pasia Village and Long Mio Village to be developed

Facilities 

 SK Long Pasia
 SIB Long Pasia Church
 Long Pasia Airport
 Klinik Kesihatan Desa Long Pasia

References 

Sipitang District
Villages in Sabah